Hristu Chiacu (born 6 September 1986) is a Romanian former footballer who plays as a midfielder for teams such as Național București, Wisła Kraków, Dinamo București, CS Otopeni, Politehnica Timișoara or Khazar Lankaran, among others.

Personal life
Hristu Chiacu is an ethnic Aromanian.

Club career

Early career
Chiacu began his youth career at Dinamo București.

Unirea Urziceni 
Chiacu signed his first professional contract with Unirea, where he scored one goal in two appearances.

Electromagnetica 
He transferred to Electromagnetica, where he scored four goals in nine appearances.

Național București 
Chiacu made his debut against FC Timișoara. He finished the season with 17 appearances for Național.

Wisła Kraków 
He signed with Wisła at Dan Petrescu's request. He scored one goal in Polish League.

Dinamo București 
He returned to Romania at the team where started football, Dinamo, but play just ten matches because he was loaned out all time.

Dacia Mioveni 
Chiacu was loaned out to Dacia Mioveni for six months, making ten appearances.

CS Otopeni 
In 2008 summer, Chiacu was loaned out again at newly promoted CS Otopeni for all season long, making 17 appearances and scoring one goal.

Astra Ploiești 
Chiacu was again loaned out at Astra, just for few weeks.

Politehnica Timișoara 
Chiacu was loaned two years by Dinamo at Poli. He was released on 14 January 2011 for poor displays and returned to Dinamo.

Personal life
His brother, Teodor was also a footballer who played for Dinamo București.

Honours
Khazar Lankaran
Azerbaijan Cup: 2010–11

References

External links
 
 

1986 births
Living people
Footballers from Bucharest
Romanian people of Aromanian descent
Aromanian sportspeople
Romanian footballers
Association football midfielders
Liga I players
Liga II players
Ekstraklasa players
Azerbaijan Premier League players
FC Unirea Urziceni players
FC Progresul București players
Wisła Kraków players
FC Dinamo București players
CS Mioveni players
CS Otopeni players
FC Astra Giurgiu players
FC Politehnica Timișoara players
Khazar Lankaran FK players
CS Concordia Chiajna players
CSM Ceahlăul Piatra Neamț players
AFC Săgeata Năvodari players
CS Balotești players
LPS HD Clinceni players
FC Carmen București players
Romanian expatriate footballers
Expatriate footballers in Poland
Romanian expatriate sportspeople in Poland
Expatriate footballers in Azerbaijan
Romanian expatriate sportspeople in Azerbaijan